The Guiyang Olympic Sports Centre Stadium is a sports venue in Guanshanhu District, Guiyang, China. With a capacity of 51,636 people, it is the largest sports venue in Guizhou Province.

Construction began in 2006, and the center was opened in 2010, with a total investment of 1.9 billion yuan. It includes a multi-purpose stadium with 51,636 seats, an 8,000-seat indoor stadium, a 3,000-seat natatorium, a 17-court tennis center, as well supporting facilities such as a media center and a training center.

The stadium hosted the Ninth National Minorities Games in 2011. It is the home stadium of Guizhou Hengfeng Zhicheng F.C. of the Chinese Super League.

References

Multi-purpose stadiums in China
Sports venues in Guizhou
2010 establishments in China
Sports venues completed in 2010
Buildings and structures in Guiyang